KF Vardari Forinë is a football club based in the village of Forinë, Gostivar Municipality, North Macedonia. They are currently competing in the Macedonian Second League (West Division).

History
The club was founded in 1974.

References

External links
Vardari Forino Facebook 
Club info at MacedonianFootball 
Football Federation of Macedonia 

Vardari Forino
Association football clubs established in 1974
1974 establishments in the Socialist Republic of Macedonia
FK
Vardari